"Some Things Just Stick in Your Mind" is a song by Mick Jagger and Keith Richards, released first by the singing duo Dick and Dee Dee (early 1965), who were a support act for the Stones when they first toured the U.S. in 1964, and then by Vashti Bunyan in May 1965 as her first single. Jimmy Page played guitar on this song, during his session work of the sixties.

Bunyan's recording went virtually unnoticed at the time, but became a rare collector's item after her resurgence in the 2000s. It was then reissued on the compilation Some Things Just Stick in Your Mind - Singles and Demos 1964 to 1967 (2007).

A version of the song by The Rolling Stones was recorded on 13 February 1964, but released only on their 1975 album Metamorphosis.

References

The Rolling Stones songs
1965 debut singles
Decca Records singles
Songs written by Jagger–Richards
Song recordings produced by Andrew Loog Oldham
1965 songs